Moorcock may refer to:

People
Ace Moorcock (born 1961), nom-de-plume for U.S. cartoonist Brad Parker
Hilary Moorcock (1936–2017; as Hilary Bailey), British editor and wife of Michael Moorcock
Michael Moorcock (born 1939), the British science fiction and fantasy fiction author

Fictional characters
 Sly Moorcock, a fictional character from the Ben Elton novel Stark

Other uses
the red grouse
The Moorcock, a famous English court case about the eponymous ship "The Moorcock"
Moor Cock Inn, a listed building; see Listed buildings in Luddendenfoot
Moorcock Inn, a pub in North Yorkshire, England

See also

 Moorfowl
 Moorhen
 
 Moor (disambiguation)
 Cock (disambiguation)